The British Florist Association is the industry trade group that represents the British flower retail trade.

Structure
The BFA represents UK florists. It is the UK member of Florint, the European Federation of Professional Florists Associations,  which is based in Veenendaal, Utrecht in the Netherlands. Floristry Business members enjoy benefits and a community of peers. Individually florists can join The Institute of Professional Florists which awards membership dependant on the level of qualification the florist holds. Corporate members (those businesses who supply the floral industry) support the association through membership as well. The organisation maintains a list of registered BFA business members on the website, who agree to uphold a code of conduct. These can be viewed by the consumer. 
The BFA took over the Society of Floristry on 28.2.2010, absorbing its membership and taking on the role as the standard-setting organisation for professional floristry in the UK. The BFA have a Training and Education committee of tutors, employers and industry professionals who liaise with relevant organisations to keep qualifications in Floristry relevant and to a high standard.

The BFA is involved with organising national competitions, and works closely with World Skills UK and the RHS on presenting the profession to the public through it exhibitions and presentations.

See also
 American Institute of Floral Designers

References

External links
 
 British Florist Association Consumer site
 International Florist Association

Video clips
 British Florist Association YouTube channel

Trade associations based in the United Kingdom
Floral organizations